Common Awards are qualifications for ordinands and lay ministers within the Church of England and its partners in the Baptist, Methodist, and United Reformed churches, delivered in a three-way partnership between theological education institutions, the churches, and Durham University.

Description 
Before 2014, Theological Education Institutions (TEIs) within the Church of England had used local universities to validate their qualifications but since September 2014 they have been offering awards common across all institutions, validated by Durham University. The intention behind the move to Common Award was to offer greater coherence and consistency across training institutions.

A wide variety of courses are offered at various levels of the Framework for Higher Education Qualifications (FHEQ):
 Foundation Award in Theology, Ministry and Mission (FHEQ level 4; 60 credits)
 Certificate of Higher Education in Theology, Ministry and Mission (FHEQ level 4; 120 credits)
 Certificate of Higher Education in Christian, Ministry and Mission (FHEQ level 5; 180 credits)
 Diploma of Higher Education in Theology, Ministry and Mission (FHEQ level 5; 240 credits)
 BA in Theology, Ministry and Mission (FHEQ level 6; 360 credits)
 Graduate Certificate in Theology, Ministry and Mission to postgraduate studies (FHEQ level 6; 60 credits)
 Graduate Diploma in Theology, Ministry and Mission to postgraduate studies (FHEQ level 6; 120 credits)
 Postgraduate Certificate in Theology, Ministry and Mission (FHEQ level 7; 60 credits)
 Postgraduate Certificate in Chaplaincy Studies (FHEQ level 7; 60 credits)
 Postgraduate Diploma in Theology, Ministry and Mission (FHEQ level 7; 120 credits)
 Postgraduate Diploma in Chaplaincy Studies (FHEQ level 7; 120 credits)
 MA in Theology, Ministry and Mission (FHEQ level 7; 180 credits)
 MA in Chaplaincy Studies (FHEQ level 7; 180 credits)
 MA in Contemporary Christian Leadership (FHEQ level 7; 180 credits)

Participating institutions

The Theological Education Institutes validated by Durham University on the Common Awards are:
 All Saints Centre for Ministry and Mission, Warrington
 Cambridge Theological Federation
 Cranmer Hall, Durham
 Cumbria Christian Learning, Cumbria
 Lincoln School of Theology, Lincoln
 Lindisfarne College of Theology, North Shields
 The Queen's Foundation, Birmingham
 Ripon College Cuddesdon, Oxfordshire
 St Mellitus College, London
 St Stephen's House, Oxford
 St Augustine's College of Theology, West Malling, Kent
 South West Ministry Training Course, Exeter
 Trinity College with Bristol Baptist College, Bristol
 Wycliffe Hall, Oxford (until 2022)
 Yorkshire Theological Education Partnership
 South Central Theological Education Institution, Guildford, Oxford, Salisbury and Winchester
 Scottish Episcopal Institute
 The Eastern Region Ministry Course, Cambridge
 Luther King Centre, Manchester
 St Padarn's Institute, Llandaff
 Emmanuel Theological College, Liverpool and the North West

References

External links
Common Awards at Durham University
National Ministry Team of the Church of England

Church of England
Professional education in England
Durham University
Educational qualifications in the United Kingdom
Christian education in the United Kingdom